Yang Ruifu (1902 – 3 February 1940), courtesy name Jieqing, was a Chinese military officer. Born in 1902 in Jinghai County, Tianjin, he joined the National Revolutionary Army in 1921, assigned the 524th Regiment of the 88th Division. He rose through the ranks from squad, platoon, company to regimental commander. One of the leaders of the Defense of Sihang Warehouse, he later escaped from incarceration at the hands of the British and rejoined the Chinese war effort. In May 1939 he moved with his family to Hechuan, Chongqing to recover, but died of a wound infection in early 1940. He was posthumously promoted to the rank of brigadier general.

Chinese people of World War II
National Revolutionary Army generals from Tianjin
1902 births
1940 deaths